Remutaka (spelled Rimutaka until 2020) is an electorate returning one member to the New Zealand House of Representatives. Since the 2008 general election, the seat has been represented by Chris Hipkins, who is currently serving as Prime Minister of New Zealand.

Profile
Centred on Upper Hutt City, and bisected by State Highway 2 and the Hutt River, the Remutaka electorate stretches from the Lower Hutt suburbs of Avalon and Naenae in the south, via Taitā, Stokes Valley, and Manor Park, through Silverstream, Trentham, and Upper Hutt Central, to Akatarawa, Te Mārua, and Kaitoke in the north.

Of those employed at the 2018 census, 13.7% were clerical and administrative workers (the highest proportion of any general electorate), 11.3% were community and personal service workers (the sixth-highest), and 11.3% worked in the public administration and safety sector (the third-highest share). The main means of travel to work for 12.5% of the employed population of Remutaka was by train, the third-highest share among general electorates and over six times the New Zealand average (2.0%).

History
Rimutaka was created in  ahead of the change to Mixed Member Proportional voting. Peter McCardle (who had been re-elected in ) defected to New Zealand First in 1996. Swain was the clear winner in every election from 1996 to 2005; the inclusion of the working-class areas of Hutt City helped make Rimutaka safer for the Labour Party, though on the campaign trail in 2008, Labour's chances for winning both party vote and the electorate were summarised as: "Labour support is 'rock solid' in the south of the electorate but things are volatile in Upper Hutt, where there is 'still work to do.

Following the 2014 boundary review, Rimutaka gained Naenae and a small part of Epuni from the  electorate and lost Kelson and Belmont to Hutt South.

Following the 2016 Treaty of Waitangi settlement between the Crown and Rangitāne o Wairarapa and Ngāti Kahungunu ki Wairarapa Tāmaki Nui-ā-Rua, the electorate's namesake Rimutaka Range was renamed to the Remutaka Range. In the 2019/2020 boundary review, the Representation Commission renamed the electorate Remutaka in line with this name change.

Members of Parliament
Unless otherwise stated, all MPs terms began and ended at general elections.

Key

List MPs
Members of Parliament elected from party lists in elections where that person also unsuccessfully contested the Rimutaka electorate. Unless otherwise stated, all MPs terms began and ended at general elections.

Election results

2020 election

2017 election

2014 election

Electorate (as at 20 September 2014): 46,526

2011 election

Electorate (as at 26 November 2011): 44,403

2008 election

2005 election

2002 election

1999 election
Refer to Candidates in the New Zealand general election 1999 by electorate#Rimutaka for a list of candidates.

Table footnotes

References

External links
2005 election results electionresults.govt.nz
 2002 election results electionresults.govt.nz

New Zealand electorates
Politics of the Wellington Region
1996 establishments in New Zealand